The Hellvi helmet eyebrow is a decorative eyebrow from a Vendel Period helmet. It comprises two fragments; the arch is made of iron decorated with strips of silver, and terminates in a bronze animal head that was cast on. The eyebrow was donated to the Statens historiska museum in November 1880 along with several other objects, all said to be from a grave find in Gotland, Sweden.

The eyebrow dates to around 550 to 600 AD, and would have once adorned one of the "crested helmets" that appeared in England and Scandinavia around that time. Many of these also featured decorated eyebrows, such as the Sutton Hoo helmet and the Broe helmet; the Hellvi example is one of a number of decorated eyebrows that have been found without other traces of the original helmet, including the Lokrume helmet fragment in Gotland and the Gevninge helmet fragment in Denmark.

Description 

They are made of iron; the smaller of the fragments terminates in an animal head, made of bronze. The bronze and iron pieces were cast together, the hardened iron placed into the mould of the molten bronze. Both fragments are inlaid, or possibly cast, with vertical strips of silver.

Discovery 
The circumstances of the discovery of the eyebrow are largely unknown. It was donated along with other items, all said to be from a grave find in Hellvi socken in Gotland, to the Statens historiska museum in November 1880, and assigned the collective inventory number 6,684. The donation, from "the watchmaker Unnerus," was recorded the following year in Månadsblad, a  monthly publication of the Royal Swedish Academy of Letters, History and Antiquities.

In 1969 Birger Nerman published an illustration of the reconstructed fragments in his volume II of his work on the Vendel Period finds from Gotland, Die Vendelzeit Gotlands; six years later, in volume I, he added a textual description. At some point before 1977, the eyebrow was further conserved at Greta Arwidsson's request, permitting more of its construction details to be perceived.

Typology 

The eyebrow has been roughly dated to the beginning of the Vendel Period, during the second half of the sixth century. Based on this period, and location, it fits into the corpus of "crested helmets", each characterized by a rounded cap and usually a prominent nose-to-nape crest, that appeared around this time in England and Scandinavia. More than half of the known examples are from Sweden; up to twenty are from Gotland alone, although these were typically found in cremation burials and, like the Hellvi example, comprise only a fragment or two.

The Hellvi example is one of many crested helmets to have featured decorated eyebrows. The Broe helmet—also from Gotland—and the Sutton Hoo helmet both have eyebrows with animal-head terminals, and inlaid strips of metal. The decorative motif of incised vertical strips has been repeated on other helmets, such as from Vendel and York, in what is probably a cheaper imitation, or an invocation of an earlier style. Other decorated helmet eyebrows have also been discovered alone. These include another decorated eyebrow from Gotland, in Lokrume, an eyebrow from Uppåkra on the mainland, and an ornate helmet eyepiece from Gevninge, Denmark. The singularity of at least the latter two finds has led to an association with the Germanic god Odin, who reputedly gave one of his eyes to drink from the well of wisdom. Another artefact found in Hellvi—a Roman mask that saw continued use in the Iron Age, and was found in a house dating to around 550—had one eye removed and buried nearby, further suggesting the contemporaneous significance of singular eyes.

References

Bibliography 

 
 
 
 
 
 
  
  
  
 
 
 
 
  
  
 
 Republished as  

1880 archaeological discoveries
Archaeological discoveries in Sweden
Germanic archaeological artifacts
Individual helmets
Medieval helmets